Charles Thomas (18 March 1840 – 29 November 1923) was a South African cricket umpire. He stood in one Test match, South Africa vs. England, in 1892.

See also
 List of Test cricket umpires

References

1840 births
1923 deaths
Place of birth missing
South African Test cricket umpires